Alberto Pineda Villa (died 12 September 2009), commonly referred to by his alias El Borrado ("The Hazle Eyes"), was a Mexican drug lord and high-ranking leader of the Beltrán Leyva Cartel, a drug trafficking organization. He was killed on 12 September 2009.
He was one of Mexico's 37 most-wanted drug lords.

See also
 List of Mexico's 37 most-wanted drug lords

References

Mexican crime bosses
2009 deaths
Year of birth missing